"Solamente Tu Amor" ("Only Your Love") is a song written by Donato Poveda and performed by Puerto Rican singer Chayanne. It was released as the lead single from his seventh studio album Volver a Nacer. Its music video was filmed in Los Angeles. It was recognized as one of the best-performing songs of the year at the 1997 American Society of Composers, Authors and Publishers in the Pop/Rock category.

Charts

Weekly charts

Year-end charts

See also
List of Billboard Latin Pop Airplay number ones of 1996

References

External links
 Official video 

1996 singles
Chayanne songs
Spanish-language songs
Songs written by Estéfano
Sony Discos singles
1996 songs